HD 34868 (HR 1758) is a solitary star located in the southern constellation Columba. With an apparent magnitude of 5.97, it's barely visible to the unaided eye. The star is located 410 light years away based on parallax, but is drifting away with a heliocentric radial velocity of 18 km/s.

Properties
HD 34868 is an ordinary A-type main-sequence star with a mass of 2.73 solar masses, and a radius of 3 solar radii. HD 34868 has a rapid projected rotational velocity of 103 km/s, and is a young star, with an age of 245 million years. However, some sources give it a classification of A1 IV, which makes it a subgiant star.

References

Columba (constellation)
1758
Columbae, 12
034868
024831
Durchmusterung objects
A-type main-sequence stars